The 1996 Cheltenham Gold Cup was a horse race which took place at Cheltenham on Thursday March 14, 1996. It was the 69th running of the Cheltenham Gold Cup, and it was won by Imperial Call. The winner was ridden by Conor O'Dwyer and trained by Fergie Sutherland. The pre-race favourite One Man finished sixth. There was one fatality in the race when Monsieur Le Cure ridden by Jason Titley took a heavy fall at the 6th fence breaking his neck.  

Imperial Call was the first winner of the Gold Cup trained in Ireland since Dawn Run in 1986.

Race details
 Sponsor: Tote
 Winner's prize money: £131,156.00
 Going: Good
 Number of runners: 10
 Winner's time: 6m 42.4s

Full result

* The distances between the horses are shown in lengths or shorter. nk = neck; PU = pulled-up.† Trainers are based in Great Britain unless indicated.Note: Fence 16 was omitted due to the fatal fall of Monsieur Le Cure on the first circuit.

Winner's details
Further details of the winner, Imperial Call:

 Foaled: February 21, 1989, in Ireland
 Sire: Callernish; Dam: Princess Menelek (Menelek)
 Owner: Lisselan Farms Ltd
 Breeder: Tom O'Donnell

References
 
 sportinglife.com
 nytimes.com – "Fergie Sutherland finds a champion and becomes a hero" – March 15, 1996.

Cheltenham Gold Cup
 1996
Cheltenham Gold Cup
Cheltenham Gold Cup
1990s in Gloucestershire